Fieh is a Norwegian neo soul band from Oslo. The group was founded by bassist Andreas Rukan, vocalist Sofie Tollefsbøl, and drummer Ola Øverby in 2014.

History
Ola Øverby, Andreas Rukan, and Sofie Tollefsbøl met after performing together for a previous band.

Their single "Glu" was featured in the video game FIFA 20.

In 2020, the band was included in the album Blue Note Re:Imagined.

Discography
Cold Water Burning Skin (2019)
In The Sun In The Rain (2022)

References

External links

Musical groups from Oslo